The Communist Action Organization in Iraq was a communist organization in Iraq. The organization was founded in, after a split from the Iraqi Communist Party. The founders of the Communist Action Organization saw the Communist Party leadership as a 'rightist and opportunist tendency', criticizing their past cooperation with the Baath Party. Moreover, the Communist Action Organization accused the Communist Party leaders for having deviated from Marxism-Leninism.

References

Defunct communist parties in Iraq
Iraqi Communist Party breakaway groups